Sōnosuke, Sonosuke or Sounosuke (written: 惣之助 or 聡之介) is a masculine Japanese given name. Notable people with the name include:

, Japanese fencer
, Japanese voice actor

Fictional 
 Sonosuke Izayoi, in Danganronpa 3: The End of Hope's Peak High School

Japanese masculine given names